Novak Djokovic defeated Stefanos Tsitsipas in the final, 6–0, 7–6(7–5) to win the men's singles tennis title at the 2022 Italian Open. It was his sixth Italian Open title and record-extending 38th Masters 1000 title overall. Djokovic did not lose a set during the tournament, and won his 1000th ATP Tour-level career match against Casper Ruud in the semifinals.

Rafael Nadal was the defending champion, but lost in the third round to Denis Shapovalov.

Djokovic and Daniil Medvedev were in contention for the ATP No. 1 singles ranking. Djokovic retained the top position by reaching the semifinals.

Seeds
The top eight seeds received a bye into the second round.

Draw

Finals

Top half

Section 1

Section 2

Bottom half

Section 3

Section 4

Seeded players

The following are the seeded players. Seedings are based on ATP rankings as of 2 May 2022. Rankings and points before are as of 9 May 2022.

As a result of special ranking adjustment rules due to the COVID-19 pandemic, players are defending the higher of (i) their points from the 2021 tournament or (ii) the remaining 50% of their points from the 2020 tournament. Those points were not mandatory and are included in the table below only if they counted towards the player's ranking as of May 9, 2022. Players who are not defending points from the 2021 or 2020 tournaments will instead have their 19th best result replaced by their points from the 2022 tournament.

† This column shows either (a) the higher of the player's points from the 2021 tournament or 50% of his points from the 2020 tournament, or (b) his 19th best result (shown in brackets). Only ranking points counting towards the player's ranking as of May 9, 2022, are reflected in the column.

Withdrawn players 
The following players would have been seeded, but withdrew before the tournament began.

Other entry information

Wildcards

Protected ranking

Withdrawals

Qualifying

Seeds

Qualifiers

Lucky losers

Draw

First qualifier

Second qualifier

Third qualifier

Fourth qualifier

Fifth qualifier

Sixth qualifier

Seventh qualifier

References

External links
 Qualifying draw
 Main draw

Singles men
Italian Open - Singles